Chesterfield is a town in the U.S. state of Indiana which lies in Union Township, Madison County and Salem Township, Delaware County. The population was 2,490 at the 2020 census. It is part of the Anderson, Indiana Metropolitan Statistical Area.

History
Chesterfield was originally named West Union, and in 1830 changed to Chesterfield. It was renamed Chesterfield in 1834.

The Chesterfield Spiritualist Camp District and George Makepeace House are listed in the National Register of Historic Places.

Geography
Chesterfield is located at  (40.112193, -85.596324).

Demographics

2020 census
As of the census of 2020,  there were 2,490 people, 1,098 households, and 404 families living in the town. The racial makeup of the town was 91.2% White, 1.2% African American, 0.6% Asian, 1.1% from other races, and 5.8% from two or more races. Hispanic or Latino of any race were 2.6% of the population.

There were 1,098 households, of which 21.0% had children under the age of 18 living with them, 44.6% were married couples living together, 27.7% had a female householder with no husband present,  20.1% had a male householder with no wife present, and 7.6% were non-families. 47.8% of all households were made up of individuals. The average household size was 2.27 and the average family size was 3.06.

31.7% of the population had never been married. 47.1% of residents were married and not separated, 7.6% were widowed, 12.9% were divorced, and 0.7% were separated.

The median age in the town was 41.6. 5.7% of residents were under the age of 5; 21.0% of residents were under the age of 18; 79.0% were age 18 or older; and 21.0% were age 65 or older. 13.2% of the population were veterans.

The most common language spoken at home was English with 97.3% speaking it at home, 2.5% spoke Spanish at home and 0.2% spoke an Asian or Pacific Islander language at home. 1.3% of the population were foreign born.

The median household income in Chesterfield was $44,219, 21.3% less than the median average for the state of Indiana. 14.1% of the population were in poverty, including 24.8% of residents under the age of 18. The poverty rate for the town was 1.2% higher than that of the state. 21.3% of the population was disabled and 10.9% had no healthcare coverage. 48.9% of the population had attained a high school or equivalent degree, 21.0% had attended college but received no degree, 11.5% had attained an Associate's degree or higher, 8.1% had attained a Bachelor's degree or higher, and 4.9% had a graduate or professional degree. 5.6% had no degree. 54.3% of Chesterfield residents were employed, working a mean of 38.6 hours per week.

2010 census
As of the census of 2010, there were 2,547 people, 1,090 households, and 663 families living in the town. The racial makeup of the town was 97.4% White, 0.4% African American, 0.2% Native American, 0.7% Asian, 0.1% from other races, and 1.3% from two or more races. Hispanic or Latino of any race were 1.1% of the population.

There were 1,090 households, of which 31.5% had children under the age of 18 living with them, 41.3% were married couples living together, 13.6% had a female householder with no husband present, 6.0% had a male householder with no wife present, and 39.2% were non-families. 32.7% of all households were made up of individuals, and 11.8% had someone living alone who was 65 years of age or older. The average household size was 2.28 and the average family size was 2.89.

The median age in the town was 39.5 years. 22.8% of residents were under the age of 18; 8.2% were between the ages of 18 and 24; 25.5% were from 25 to 44; 26.3% were from 45 to 64; and 17.3% were 65 years of age or older. The gender makeup of the town was 48.5% male and 51.5% female.

2000 census
As of the census of 2000, there were 2,969 people, 1,269 households, and 808 families living in the town. The racial makeup of the town was 98.42% White, 0.40% African American, 0.10% Native American, 0.30% Asian, 0.30% from other races, and 0.47% from two or more races. Hispanic or Latino of any race were 1.38% of the population.

There were 1,269 households, out of which 31.3% had children under the age of 18 living with them, 48.3% were married couples living together, 11.4% had a female householder with no husband present, and 36.3% were non-families. 30.8% of all households were made up of individuals, and 11.6% had someone living alone who was 65 years of age or older. The average household size was 2.30 and the average family size was 2.87.

In the town, the population was spread out, with 24.2% under the age of 18, 8.5% from 18 to 24, 29.9% from 25 to 44, 22.5% from 45 to 64, and 14.9% who were 65 years of age or older. The median age was 36 years. For every 100 females, there were 87.7 males. For every 100 females age 18 and over, there were 84.3 males.

The median income for a household in the town was $37,143, and the median income for a family was $47,222. Males had a median income of $35,412 versus $22,966 for females. The per capita income for the town was $18,738. About 2.9% of families and 5.9% of the population were below the poverty line, including 5.9% of those under age 18 and 7.5% of those age 65 or over.

Transport
Chesterfield is served by a variety of major roads.
  Interstate 69 (exit 34)
  State Road 32
  State Road 67
  State Road 232

References

External links
 Town website

Towns in Delaware County, Indiana
Towns in Indiana
Towns in Madison County, Indiana